Ixtayutla Mixtec is a Mixtec language of Oaxaca. It is close to Chayuco and Zacatepec Mixtec.

References 

Mixtec language